Boris Baláž (born November 20, 1997) is a Slovak competitive archer. Baláž made his debut on the Slovak national team at the age of nine, and eventually competed in numerous international archery tournaments, spanning the 2014 Summer Youth Olympics, the 2015 European Games, and the 2016 Summer Olympics. Baláž currently trains under the tutelage of head coach Miroslav Bendík for the Slovak squad, while shooting at a local archery range in his native Liptovský Mikuláš.

At the 2016 Summer Olympics in Rio de Janeiro, Baláž etched a historic mark for Slovakia as one of the country's first archers sent to the Olympic tournament, shooting only in the men's individual recurve. Baláž managed to fire off a score of 631 points, including 18 targets of a perfect ten, for the fifty-ninth spot against a field of 63 other archers in the qualifying round, before he faced his initial challenge against the eventual champion Ku Bon-chan of South Korea, abruptly ending his Olympic debut in a harsh 0–6 defeat.

References

External links
 Boris Baláž at the Slovenský Olympijský Výbor 
 
 

Slovak male archers
Living people
Sportspeople from Liptovský Mikuláš
1997 births
Archers at the 2015 European Games
European Games competitors for Slovakia
Archers at the 2014 Summer Youth Olympics
Olympic archers of Slovakia
Archers at the 2016 Summer Olympics